Cameroon competed at the 2019 African Games held from 19 to 31 August 2019 in Rabat, Morocco. In total, athletes representing Cameroon won 5 gold medals, 14 silver medals and 9 bronze medals and the country finished 11th in the medal table.

Medal summary

Medal table 

|  style="text-align:left; width:78%; vertical-align:top;"|

|  style="text-align:left; width:22%; vertical-align:top;"|

Athletics 

No medals were won by athletes representing Cameroon in athletics.

Jean Tarcisius Batamboc and Mayoumendam Zounedou competed in the men's 100 metres event.

Fanny Appes Ekanga competed in the women's 200 metres event.

Boxing 

Seven athletes were scheduled to compete in boxing. Dorine Stéphane Mambou won the bronze medal in the women's featherweight (57kg) event.

Chess 

Four chess players represented Cameroon in chess.

Football 

Cameroon's women's national under-20 football team won the silver medal in the women's tournament.

Gymnastics 

In total, four athletes represented Cameroon in gymnastics.

Handball 

The women's national handball team competed in handball at the 2019 African Games. They won the silver medal in the women's tournament.

Judo 

Eight athletes represented Cameroon in judo: Njepang Njapa Audrey Dilane, Ayuk Otay Arrey Sophina, Tsala Tsala Bernadin, Dieudonne Dolassem, Bell Ngindjel Franck Parisi, Hélène Wezeu Dombeu, Hortence Atangana and Bata Philomene Jocelin.

Karate 

Cameroon competed in karate.

Table tennis 

Cameroon competed in table tennis.

Nyoh Ofon Derek and Sarah Hanffou  competed in table tennis.

Derek competed in the men's singles event and Sarah competed in the women's singles event. Sarah won the silver medal in that event.

They both also competed in the mixed doubles event.

Taekwondo 

Adjewa Frederic, Amougou Antoine Thiery, Neyi Esrom and Touembou Kamgue Silvere competed in Taekwondo.

Volleyball 

Both's the men's and women's national volleyball teams competed in volleyball.

The men's team won gold in the men's tournament and the women's team won silver in the women's tournament.

Weightlifting 

Cameroon competed in weightlifting. In total, athletes representing Cameroon in weightlifting won one gold medal and eight silver medals.

Wrestling 

Six wrestlers represented Cameroon. In total they won one gold medal, one silver medal and two bronze medals.

References 

Nations at the 2019 African Games
2019
African Games